Euptera freyja is a butterfly in the family Nymphalidae. It is found in Cameroon, the Democratic Republic of the Congo, Zambia and possibly Angola. The habitat consists of forests.

Subspecies
Euptera freyja freyja (north-western Zambia)
Euptera freyja inexpectata Chovet, 1998 (coast of Cameroon)
Euptera freyja ornata Libert, 1998 (central Cameroon, Democratic Republic of the Congo: Lusambo, Sankuru and possibly Cataractes)

References

Butterflies described in 1984
Euptera